Tlalcuahuitl  or land rod also known as a cuahuitl  was an Aztec unit of measuring distance that was approximately ,  to  or  long.

The abbreviation used for tlalcuahuitl is (T) and the unit square of a tlalcuahuitl is (T²).

Subdivisions of tlalcuahuitl

Acolhua Congruence Arithmetic
Using their knowledge of tlalcuahuitl, Barbara J. Williams of the Department of Geology at the University of Wisconsin and María del Carmen Jorge y Jorge of the Research Institute for Applied Mathematics and FENOMEC Systems at the National Autonomous University of Mexico believe the Aztecs used a special type of arithmetic. This arithmetic (tlapōhuallōtl ) the researchers called Acolhua  Congruence Arithmetic and it was used to calculate the area of Aztec people's land as demonstrated below:

See also
 meter
 feet

References

Units of length
Aztec mathematics